Platydoris ellioti is a species of sea slug, a dorid nudibranch, shell-less marine opisthobranch gastropod mollusks in the family Discodorididae.

Distribution
This species was described from India. It is reported from the East coast of Africa to northern Australia.

References

External links 
 

Discodorididae
Gastropods described in 1864